Dragon is the thirteenth studio album by Japanese heavy metal band Loudness. It was released in 1998 only in Japan.

Track listing
All music by Akira Takasaki except "Babylon" by Hirotsugu Homma. All Lyrics by Masaki Yamada.

"9 Miles High" - 3:45
"Dogshit" - 4:45
"Wicked Witches" - 4:25
"Crazy Go Go" - 4:17
"Voodoo Voices" - 4:24
"Kaisō" (回想) (instrumental) - 1:56
"Babylon" - 4:54
"Crawl" - 5:17
"Forbidden Love" - 4:38
"Mirror Ball" - 5:08
"Taj Mahal" (instrumental) - 5:30
"Nightcreepers" - 5:21

Personnel
Loudness
Masaki Yamada - vocals
Akira Takasaki - guitars, producer
Naoto Shibata - bass
Hirotsugu Homma - drums

Production
Daniel McClendon - engineer, mixing
Galen T. Berens, Masayuki Nomura, Masayuki Aihara, Takayuki Ichikawa - engineers
George Azuma - supervisor
Masao Nakajima - executive producer

References

1998 albums
Loudness (band) albums